The Trusal Covered Bridge is a historic wooden covered bridge located at Washington Township in Indiana County, Pennsylvania. It crosses Plum Creek. It is one of four remaining covered bridge in Indiana County.

It was listed on the National Register of Historic Places in 1979.

References

External links

Covered bridges on the National Register of Historic Places in Pennsylvania
Covered bridges in Indiana County, Pennsylvania
Bridges completed in 1870
Wooden bridges in Pennsylvania
Bridges in Indiana County, Pennsylvania
National Register of Historic Places in Indiana County, Pennsylvania
Road bridges on the National Register of Historic Places in Pennsylvania
Lattice truss bridges in the United States
1870 establishments in Pennsylvania